Nattividad is the second studio album by Dominican recording artist Natti Natasha, released on September 24, 2021, by Pina Records and Sony Music Latin.

Track listing

Charts

Weekly charts

Year-end charts

Certifications

References

2021 albums
Natti Natasha albums
Pina Records albums
Sony Music Latin albums